Josef Zeman (23 January 1915 – 3 May 1999) was a Czech footballer.

He played for several clubs, including SK České Budějovice and Sparta Prague and the Czechoslovakia national football team (4 matches/2 goals), for whom he appeared in the 1938 FIFA World Cup, scoring one goal.

References

1915 births
1999 deaths
Czech footballers
Czechoslovak footballers
1938 FIFA World Cup players
Czechoslovakia international footballers
AC Sparta Prague players
SK Dynamo České Budějovice players
Association football forwards
People from Jindřichův Hradec District
Sportspeople from the South Bohemian Region